There are 19 Foreign Archaeological Institutes in Greece, also known as "schools," all based in Athens. Seventeen of them are officially accredited. In addition to conducting their share of government-authorized research projects, they issue reports and other publications, support specialised archaeological/classical libraries, conduct regular lecture programmes, award scholarships/bursaries and provide accommodation for a fee. They do not offer degrees, nor are their courses part of any regular, gradated curriculum.

The "students" are not regular students as they are known in the countries of initiation; in fact, some schools, such as the British School, now avoid the term, in favor of "member." The members, or students, are often already degreed professionals in archaeology or related fields. They take courses to prepare themselves for the research conducted by the school, which is typically archaeological. Undergraduate or graduate students present are enrolled in degree programs in their own countries.

The "foreign archaeological schools" are research institutes. Some have associated laboratories. Some of the institutes also maintain specific site facilities or study centres outside Athens. Additionally there is one separate foreign-run Archaeological library in Athens, as well as one foreign research institution elsewhere in Greece.

Compliance with Hellenic Law 3028/2002
From the Hellenic point of view, the foreign archaeological schools exist to assist in the professional recovery and protection of overwhelming numbers of antiquities within and below the country's topography. All of ancient Greece, the oldest civilization of Europe, lies hidden under the soil (unless already excavated). Antiquities have always been a prey to treasure-hunters, collectors, dealers of all sorts, and the thefts and counterfeits of unscrupulous men. In the 19th century the native Hellenic cultural establishment were desperate for any professional assistance they could obtain. They found it in the zeal of like-minded classicists of the other nations of Europe, who hastened to found the initial foreign archaeological schools. These now semi-legendary archaeologists and schools dominated the culture scene, excavating places such as Delphi, Olympia, Mycenae, Knossos, and Troy in Turkey. There was little restriction on the removal of antiquities from the country, or on their private ownership. Permits were relatively easy to obtain.

Today a long period of peace and stability under the Hellenic Republic has enabled the Hellenes to recapture a much higher level of control over the processing and preservation of their antiquities and monuments. Hellenic institutions have come to the fore and Hellenic archaeologists dominate the culture scene. The keystone of this new arc of protection is Hellenic Law No. 3028/2002 "on the Protection of Antiquities and Cultural Heritage in General," passed by the Hellenic Parliament in 2002, and implemented by the President. In a single sweeping injunction it declares all antiquities the property of the state and establishes criminal penalties for mishandling them. A network of archaeological councils is set up over localities and regions of the entire country, which must be advised of the presence of antiquities and consulted as to their disposition. They take precedence over any other consideration. This is the framework into which the foreign archaeological institutes now fit. They take their marching orders, so to speak, from the councils of government. They must accept oversight and advice. Without their accreditation can be no authorization to excavate, survey, or experiment.

Law 3028/2002 labels what English speakers know as an archaeological excavation, or in slang, "a dig," as "archaeological research in situ." It is defined as "the exploration of the ground, the subsoil, the seabed, or the bed of lakes and rivers for the purpose of locating or discovering ancient monuments ...." These researches are divided into two types. The first is "systematic excavations." These are not undertaken as part of any emergency activity to rescue threatened antiquities, but are assigned to excavating institutions in due process by the Minister of Culture. These institutions can be the Greek Archaeological Service, "domestic ... institutions," or "foreign archaeological missions or schools established in Greece." This is the only type allowed to the foreign schools. The second type, "rescue excavations," is reserved to the Greek Archaeological Service. It may involve intervention in Greek business operations or property ownership."

The law allows to each accredited school "a Maximum of three excavations or other archaeological research per annum." They can have another three in cooperation with the Greek Archaeological Service. "Other archaeological research" applies to the surface, and must be non-destructive. In this category are surface surveys. Permission is required for the use of metal detectors. All permissions are granted by the Minister of Culture. To simplify the procedures and investigations required, the ministry has adopted a policy of only accepting foreign applications that have been processed through the appropriate accredited foreign school. Exclusive though it may seem, this requirement excludes excessive or trivial excavations, and screens archaeologists for suitability. The Greek Archaeological Service is free to spend most of its resources on rescue archaeology.

Law 3028 represents an ideal, but it must be applied to real people in specific circumstances. The numerous books on the topic recount many exceptions in actual practice, which must be cleared by the archaeological councils; for example, foreign archaeologists may be asked to help with rescue archaeology, or the schools may be asked to provide resources to the Hellenic Archaeological Service. Also, many of the personnel of the earlier schools found themselves entangled in historical events, typically not as members of the schools, but because they had intimate knowledge of the society and its history. The schools are not per se political. David George Hogarth, for example, a Director for a term of the British School, was an intelligence officer in the British Navy. The school had no use for him in that capacity. Along with Arthur Evans and Duncan Mackenzie, he worked very hard at archaeology in Phylakopi and Crete. John Pendlebury, Curator of the museum at Knossos, gave his life for Greece in the Battle of Crete in 1941, but not in any capacity as Curator or member of the school. He had returned home, only to be recruited into the British Army and sent back to Crete to work as an operative because of his knowledge of the locality and the people. He was caught and shot there by German paratroopers.

Foreign archaeological institutes ("schools") in Athens 
 American School of Classical Studies at Athens (ASCSA)
 Australian Archaeological Institute at Athens (AAIA)
 Austrian Archaeological Institute at Athens (ÖAI Athens)
 Belgian School at Athens (EBSA)
 British School at Athens (BSA)
 Canadian Institute in Greece (CIG-ICG)
 Danish Institute at Athens (DIA)
 Finnish Institute at Athens (FIA)
 French School at Athens (EfA)
 Georgian Institute at Athens
 German Archaeological Institute at Athens (DAI Athens)
 Irish Institute of Hellenic Studies at Athens (IIHSA)
 Italian School of Archaeology at Athens (SAIA)
 Netherlands Institute in Athens (NIA, see below)
 Norwegian Institute at Athens (also NIA, see above)
 The Polish Archaeological Institute at Athens (PAIA)
 Romanian Archaeological Institute in Athens (RAIA)
 Swedish Institute at Athens (SIA)
 Swiss School of Archaeology in Greece (ESAG/SASG/SEAG)

Foreign-managed archaeological libraries in Athens 
Nordic Library at Athens

Foreign-managed site facilities or study centres outside Athens 
Aigeira (Achaea) – Austrian School
Corinth (Corinthia) – American School
Delos (Cyclades) – French School
Delphi (Phocis) – French School
Eretria (Euboia) – Swiss School
Knossos (Crete) – British School
Malia (Crete) – French School
Nafplio/Tiryns (Argolid) – German School
Nafplio (Argolid) – Swedish School
Olympia (Elis) – German School
Palaikastro (Crete) – British School
Phaistos (Crete) – Italian School
Gortyn (Crete) – Italian School

Foreign archaeological research institutions based outside Athens 
Institute for Aegean Prehistory Study Center for East Crete (INSTAP-SCEG), based in Pacheia Ammos, Crete

Notes

References 
 

 
Foreign Archaeological Institutes